Williams Island may refer to several places:

 Williams Island Dam, in Richmond, Virginia, United States
 Williams Island (South Australia), located south-east of Port Lincoln, Australia
 Williams Island Formation, a geologic formation in Ontario, Canada
 Williams Island, a section of Aventura, Florida, United States
 Williams Rocks, a group of islands in Antarctica

See also 
 King William Island, an island in the Kitikmeot Region of Nunavut, which is part of the Canadian Arctic Archipelago